Daniel Thomson (10 August 1891, in Dundee – ?) was a Scottish professional footballer.

Thomson began his career with Aberdeen before moving on to St Johnstone from where he joined Bristol City in the 1925–26 season. He spent the following season with Bournemouth & Boscombe Athletic before joining Torquay United in 1927. He played in United's first match in the Football League, a 1–1 draw with local rivals Exeter City at Plainmoor on 27 August 1927. He played in the next eight games for Torquay before losing his place to Jack Pattison. Thomson played only two further league games before joining Walsall in 1928.

1891 births
Footballers from Dundee
Scottish footballers
Aberdeen F.C. players
St Johnstone F.C. players
Bristol City F.C. players
AFC Bournemouth players
Torquay United F.C. players
Walsall F.C. players
Year of death missing
Scottish Football League players
Association football wingers